See You in My 19th Life is an upcoming South Korean television series starring Shin Hye-sun, Ahn Bo-hyun, Ha Yoon-kyung, and Ahn Dong-goo. It is based on a webtoon of the same name by writer Lee Hey, which was published on Naver. It is scheduled for release on tvN in the spring of 2023. It will also be available for streaming on Netflix in selected regions.

Synopsis
Ban Ji-eum is a girl who has been repeating her life through reincarnation for nearly a thousand years, and can remember all her past lives. After her eighteenth life is cut short due to an accident, she decides to reconnect with the man from her previous life in the nineteenth one.

Cast

Main
 Shin Hye-sun as Ban Ji-eum / Yoon Joo-won
 Park So-yi as young Ban Ji-eum
 Kim Si-a as young Yoon Joo-won
 Ahn Bo-hyun as Moon Seo-ha
 Jung Hyeon-jun as young Moon Seo-ha
 Ha Yoon-kyung as Yoon Cho-won
 Ki So-yoo as young Yoon Cho-won
 Ahn Dong-goo as Ha Do-yoon

Supporting
 Ryu Hae-joon as Lee Ji-seok
 Lee Chae-min as Kang Min-ki
 Choi Jin-ho as Moon Jung-hoon

Production
It was reported that actress Lim Hyun-joo was initially confirmed to play the role of Yoon Cho-won, but she stepped down from the series due to scheduling issues.

References

External links

 

Korean-language television shows
TVN (South Korean TV channel) television dramas
Television series by Studio Dragon
Television series by Studio N (Naver)
South Korean fantasy television series
South Korean romance television series
Television shows based on South Korean webtoons
2023 South Korean television series debuts

Television shows about reincarnation
Upcoming television series